Pimpri is an affluent neighbourhood in the northwestern city limits of Pune, India.

Demographics
The main language spoken in the town is Marathi. It is a business hub in India famous for its clothing and eateries. Well versed with religious spots for all religions, Pimpri is an example of unity in diversity of the country and depicts a true Indian spirit. People are known for their helping hand and charity for various religious and other occasions. Mata Vaishnav Devi Temple, a replica of original in Katra is one of the most visited places. People from various parts of the country come to visit religious places by which Pimpri is surrounded. Langar is organised by various social groups on weekly / monthly / yearly basis. Cheti Chand Mela is celebrated with celebrities from Bollywood called upon. Pimpri also has historical schools, including Jai Hind School, Junior College Hindustan Antibiotics, and Dr. D. Y. Patil School and College. The neighbourhood also contains several hospitals, including YCM Hospital and D. Y. Patil Hospital.

History
Earlier Pimpri was in under the kingdom of Raja Bhoj & the land of Pimpri has been fulfilled by The great king Chhatrapati Shivaji Maharaj.

Culture
Gurunanak Jayanti, Chalio, Bahrana Sahib, Navratra, Diwali, Ganesh Chaturthi, Diwali, Shiv Jayanti, Ambedkar Jayanti and Eid-e-Milad are celebrated with lot of rigor and joy, Dussehra is also one of the important festival. All industries are closed during that time.

Industries
There are many industries based in Pimpri. These include Tata Motors, Mercedes Benz, Bajaj Auto, Bhooj Adda, Force Motors, Eaton, Times of India, etc.

Transport
Pimpri is well connected by road, rail and air. The nearest airport is Pune Airport, with the Maharashtra government planning to set up a new airport near Chakan. Pune - Lonavla suburban local trains run through this area. The railway station for this area is Pimpri Railway Station. It has a State Transport Bus stand Pimpri-Chinchwad Bus Stand at Vallabhnagar. Pune Mahanagar Parivahan Mahamandal Limited (formed by merger of PCMT and PMT) operates the public transport system in this area. The Maharashtra government has proposed metro connectivity to Pimpri under the Pune Metro project. A Rainbow BRTS system is also under expansion in this area.

PCMC

Pimpri comes under Pimpri-Chinchwad Municipal Corporation. This corporation is situated in Pimpri. It was established in 1982 covering an area of about 87 square kilometers.

Some primary schools and pre-primary schools affiliated to Maharashtra state board have been developed in this locality in the past few years. Many schools affiliated to national education boards ICSE and CBSE have been established within the area limits.

Schools 

 VIBGYOR Roots

0 and Rise Pimpri
 Global Indian International School
 Nirmal Bethany High School and Junior College
 Alphonsa High School

See also 
 Pune
 Pune Metropolitan Area
 Pimpri-Chinchwad

References

External links
 Pimpri Chinchwad Municipal Corporation Website
 Information about Pimpri-Chinchwad
 www.dypcoe-akurdi.org/

Cities and towns in Pune district
 
Twin cities